Mid-term parliamentary elections were held in Costa Rica on 6 December 1925. The Republican Party received the most votes. Voter turnout was 35.8%.

Results

References

1925 elections in Central America
1925 in Costa Rica
Elections in Costa Rica